TCDD DE 24000 (stylised as DE 24 000 in painted registration numbers) is a type of diesel locomotive built for operations on Turkish State Railways (TCDD) by Tülomsaş. 218 units were built between 1970 and 1984 under license from Matériel de Traction Electrique (MTE) of France. The DE 24000 formed the backbone of the dieselisation of the Turkish railways during the 1970s. It follows the hood unit road switcher design, like most Turkish mainline locomotives. DE 24 000 is the most commonly found locomotive class in Turkey (418 units produced, more than 100 in usable state).

In addition to MTE, diesel parts were supplied by Chantiers de l'Atlantique, electric parts from Jeumont-Schneider, and mechanical parts from Forges et Ateliers du Creusot.

History
During the 1970s the Turkish State Railways decided to replace their 800 steam locomotives with diesel. This quite-delayed task required the delivery of more than 400 diesel units. On February 15, 1968, TCDD and MTE signed an agreement for delivery of the DE 24000 along with the delivery of the smaller DE18000. To build up domestic competence on diesel engines, TCDD  decided that the production would be done by Tülomsaş of Turkey. Only Tülomsaş-built units are still operational.

Blue trains (Mavi tren) and DE 24000

Blue trains are express passenger trains with  timetable speed. They originally started replacing black trains, which are trains pulled by black steam locomotives with tenders. All cars of the blue trains had blue livery and were pulled by blue DE24000s. They are now pulled by TCDD E68000s and have regular livery but still retain their long-distance national passenger rail network status.

Overspeeding provision
These locomotives had been used over their power and speed ratings until 2004. Delayed trains were "force-fit" into the timetable by overspeeding up to 10% over timetable speeds. This required both overspeeding the prime mover and modifying the traction motors' final drive ratios. This practice was banned after the Pamukova train derailment.

External links
 Tülomsaş page on DE 24000

Tülomsaş locomotives
Co-Co locomotives
Turkish State Railways diesel locomotives
Standard gauge locomotives of Turkey
Railway locomotives introduced in 1970